Nemo judex in causa sua (or nemo judex in sua causa) (which, in Latin, literally means "no-one is judge in his own cause") is a principle of natural justice that no person can judge a case in which they have an interest. In many jurisdictions the rule is very strictly applied to any appearance of a possible bias, even if there is actually none: "Justice must not only be done, but must be seen to be done".

This principle may also be called:
 nemo judex idoneus in propria causa est
 nemo judex in parte sua
 nemo judex in re sua
 nemo debet esse judex in propria causa
 in propria causa nemo judex

The legal effect of a breach of natural justice is normally to stop the proceedings and render any judgment invalid; it should be quashed or appealed, but may be remitted for a valid re-hearing.

The phrase is credited to Sir Edward Coke in the seventeenth century, but has also been attested as early as 1544.

See also
Audi alteram partem
Judicial disqualification
List of legal Latin terms

References

Further reading 

Brocards (law)
Legal rules with Latin names
Legal doctrines and principles